Ernst Ludwig Leitner (born 14 October 1943) is an Austrian composer, organist and academic teacher.

Education 
Born in Wels, Leitner studied music education, organ and composition at the Mozarteum University Salzburg and finally musicology at the University of Innsbruck from 1963 until 1968.

From 1970, he taught organ and music theory at the Mozarteum in Salzburg and headed the music education department there from 1973 to 1983. In 1978, he was appointed university lecturer. From 2000 to 2008, he was head of the department of conducting, composition and music theory. From 2000 to 2009, he chaired the Senate of the Mozarteum University Salzburg. Between 1970 and 1996, he was artistic director of the Wels Bach Choir founded by Johann Nepomuk David and performed organ concerts in numerous European countries as well as in the USA and Canada.

Work 
His artistic output is documented in the music collection of the Austrian National Library and covers several genres, including four symphonies, eight instrumental concertos, a requiem and three operas. Leitner's works have received numerous awards and have been performed by renowned orchestras and ensembles at renowned venues and festivals. The artist has an extensive discography.

Operas 
 So weiß wie Schnee, so rot wie Blut (1999)
 Die Sennenpuppe (2008)
 Die Hochzeit (2009)
 Fadinger (2014)

Awards 
 1981 Kulturmedaille der Stadt Wels
 1983 1. Preis beim Internationalen Kompositionswettbewerb München
 1984 Kulturpreis des Landes Oberösterreich
 1985 Förderungspreis der Internationale Bachakademie Stuttgart
 1990 Johann Jakob Froberger-Preis (Kaltern/Stuttgart)
 1996 Verdienstmedaille der Stadt Wels
 1996 
 2010 Anton Bruckner Prize.
 2012 Heinrich Gleißner Prize.
 2013

References

Further reading 
 Christoph Wigelbeyer: Ernst Ludwig Leitner. Ein Portrait. Diplomarbeit aus Musikgeschichte, Universität für Musik Wien, 1998.
 Christoph Wigelbeyer: Ernst Ludwig Leitner: „So weiß wie Schnee, so rot wie Blut.“ In Österreichische Musikzeitschrift, vol. 54, fascicules 7–8, 1999, .

External links 
 
 Ernst Ludwig Leitner in the database Music Austria, music information center austria of the Austrian Composers Association
 

Austrian composers
Austrian opera composers
Austrian classical organists
Academic staff of Mozarteum University Salzburg
1943 births
Living people
People from Wels